Shanghai Three Gun Clothing Manufacturing Factory Co Ltd is a clothing company headquartered in Pudong, Shanghai.

It was previously based in Huangpu District, and in Xinqiao Town in Songjiang District. It was established in 1991.

In 2017 the company collaborated with Mattel, and the American company's Fisher-Price subsidiary, in making a clothing line for infants and toddlers.

See also
 Cosmo Lady - Chinese women's underwear manufacturer and retail store company based in Dongguan, Guangdong

References

External links
 Three Gun 
  

Companies based in Shanghai
Chinese companies established in 1991
Clothing companies established in 1991
Textile companies of China
Clothing brands
Underwear brands